The Men's pentathlon 1B was one of the events held in Athletics at the 1972 Summer Paralympics in Heidelberg.

There were 7 competitors in the event.

Patrick Reid of Jamaica won the gold medal.

Results

Final

References 

Pentathlon